Sadatlı is a village and municipality in the Jalilabad Rayon of Azerbaijan.  It has a population of 721.

Religion
An officially registered Muslim religious community operates in this village.

References 

Populated places in Jalilabad District (Azerbaijan)